The Second Zahle Cabinet was the government of Denmark from 21 June 1913 to 29 March 1920. It replaced the Berntsen Cabinet, and was dismissed by Christian X leading to the Easter Crisis of 1920.

History
It was the government which led the country through the First World War and gave women and servants the right to vote.

List of ministers
The cabinet consisted of these ministers:

References

1913 establishments in Denmark
1920 disestablishments in Denmark
Zahle II